Joanne Lipman (born June 18, 1961) is an American journalist and author who has served as chief editor at USA Today, the USA Today Network, Conde Nast, and The Wall Street Journal's Weekend Journal. She is the author of That's What She Said: What Men Need to Know (and Women Need to Tell Them) About Working Together (William Morrow, January 30, 2018). She is also the inaugural Peretsman Scully Distinguished Journalism Fellow at Princeton's Institute for Advanced Study  and a CNBC on-air contributor. Until December 31, 2017, she was Chief Content Officer of publishing company Gannett, and editor-in-chief of USA TODAY and the USA TODAY Network, comprising the flagship title plus 109 local media organizations, including the Detroit Free Press, The Des Moines Register and The Arizona Republic.  The CCO role, a new position, was created to unite Gannett's media properties into the nationwide USA TODAY Network, encompassing the company's 3,000 journalists. "That's What She Said," published by William Morrow, grew out of her viral Wall Street Journal article, "Women at Work: A Guide for Men."   She is co-author, with Melanie Kupchynsky, of Strings Attached: One Tough Teacher and the Gift of Great Expectations, published by Hyperion in the U.S., with international editions in Europe and Asia.  She was the founding editor-in-chief of Conde Nast Portfolio magazine and Portfolio.com website from 2005 to 2009. Previously she was a deputy managing editor of The Wall Street Journal, the first woman to hold that position. She is a frequent television commentator on business issues, appearing on CNN, CNBC, CBS and other news outlets. She has also contributed to The New York Times.

Biography and career
Lipman was raised in East Brunswick, New Jersey, the daughter of Diane H. and Burton E. Lipman. Her mother was a programmer analyst and her father was an author of business books and CEO of a cardiac pacemaker component manufacturing company.  She graduated from East Brunswick High School and summa cum laude from Yale University with a B.A. degree in history. While a student at Yale, she worked as an intern for The Wall Street Journal, which she joined as a staff reporter upon graduating in 1983. In 1984 she reported that Alastair Reid, a staff writer for The New Yorker, had created composite characters and otherwise altered facts in his reporting. After covering the insurance and real estate beats, she created and wrote the Journal's daily Advertising column from 1989 through 1992. She served as a Page One editor of the Journal from 1992 through 1996.

In 1998, she created the Journal's popular Friday section, Weekend Journal. She served as its editor-in-chief through 2000, when she was named a Deputy Managing Editor of the newspaper, the first woman to hold that post. In 2002, she oversaw the creation of a new fourth section, Personal Journal. The New York Times described her role as the Journal's "innovator in chief."

In 2005, Lipman moved to Conde Nast to create Conde Nast Portfolio and Portfolio.com, a business magazine and website that launched in April 2007. The magazine was widely praised for its coverage leading up to and about the 2008 financial crisis, including its 2008 cover story by Michael Lewis that was the basis for his bestselling book, and subsequent film, The Big Short. However, following the financial crisis, Portfolio's parent company Conde Nast suffered from declining ad revenue as advertisers pulled back on their spending, forcing it to shutter a number of its magazines, including Conde Nast Portfolio, which closed in May 2009 after 21 issues. The website, Portfolio.com, is now being run by a Conde Nast sister company, American City Business Journals.

Lipman serves on the Yale University Council,  the Yale Daily News board of directors, and the Breastcancer.org advisory board. She is a member of the Council on Foreign Relations.  She has served as a judge for the Pulitzer Prize and National Magazine Awards, among others.

"That's What She Said"
Lipman's bestselling book, That's What She Said: What Men Need to Know (And Women Need to Tell Them) About Working Together, was published by William Morrow in 2018. The book contends that men must be mobilized to help close the gender gap at work, and offers strategies and solutions to help achieve workplace parity. Through a combination of reporting, data and storytelling, Lipman illuminates case studies spanning Silicon Valley, the Enron scandal, Harvard Business School's attempt to wipe out bias, and Iceland's response to the 2008 financial crisis.

The New York Times, in its review, called That's What She Said  "eerily prescient in light of our current conversation about sexual politics in the workplace...revelatory" and named it an Editor's Choice. The book was named to the bestseller list of the Washington Post, which in its review said Lipman "makes a powerful case for men to join with women to solve the persistent inequities on the job" and "offers dozens of examples of bold leaders taking a stand and engaging women to push forward a transformation. But she also piles on the evidence of a sustained gender gap so that inequities cannot simply be mansplained away."

That's What She Said was also the inaugural selection of the World Economic Forum for their WEF Book Club.

Additional coverage of the book included Time, USA Today, Fortune, Forbes, Vanity Fair, Glamour, the New York Post and the London Sunday Times (a "must-read"). Lipman's television appearances for the book included CNN, MSNBC, CNBC, and PBS, among others.

In the UK, the book is published by Hodder and Stoughton under the title Win Win: When Business Works for Women, It Works for Everyone. It was named a best book of the month by the Financial Times.

Awards and honors
Under Lipman's leadership, the USA TODAY Network was awarded three Pulitzer Prizes, including the first Pulitzer in USA TODAY's history, and had an additional three finalists.

In 2018, Pulitzer Prizes were awarded to the USA TODAY Network in three categories. In Explanatory Reporting, "The Wall," a multimedia project by the staffs of the Arizona Republic and the USA TODAY Network, won for examining the "difficulties and unintended consequences of fulfilling President Donald Trump's pledge to construct a wall along the US border with Mexico." In Local Reporting, the Cincinnati Enquirer's "Seven Days of Heroin" series won for detailing how the drug has ravaged the community. In Editorial Writing, Andie Dominick of the Des Moines Register won for her writing on "the damaging consequences for poor Iowa residents of privatizing the state's administration of Medicaid."

Pulitzer finalists in 2018 were in the National Reporting category, for Brett Murphy of the USA TODAY Network for "Rigged," an investigation into abused truckers; and Editorial Cartooning, recognizing Mike Thompson of the Detroit Free Press.

In 2017, the USA TODAY Network, in its first full year as a network, was also recognized as a Pulitzer Prize finalist for Investigative Reporting – the first time USA TODAY was a finalist in that category.

In 2008, Portfolio was awarded a National Magazine Award, with the magazine's "Brief" section cited for being "Consistently smart, contrarian, and well-reported....an original take on ambition, invention, ego, drama, and conflict. The surprisingly fresh and clean design complements and furthers and section's distinctive voice as it charts the impact of business on society, culture, and politics."

While on the Journal's Page One, Lipman edited a series that earned the paper the 1995 Pulitzer Prize in feature writing. In 2005, the Journal won two Pulitzer Prizes for coverage that appeared in Weekend Journal and Personal Journal.

Lipman received the John Hancock award in 1993 for Excellence for her daily Advertising column. In 2001, she received the Matrix Award from New York Women in Communications for achievement in the newspaper category.

Personal
In 1987, Lipman married entertainment lawyer Thomas Distler in a Jewish ceremony at the National Arts Club in Manhattan; they have two children.

References

External links
 
 

American women journalists
Jewish American journalists
Living people
1961 births
CNN people
USA Today people
East Brunswick High School alumni
Journalists from New Jersey
People from East Brunswick, New Jersey
The Wall Street Journal people
21st-century American Jews
21st-century American women